Yoo Ok-ryul (born 1 March 1973) is a Korean former gymnast who competed in the 1992 Summer Olympics.

Education
 Kyung Hee University

References

External links
 
 
 

1973 births
Living people
South Korean male artistic gymnasts
Olympic gymnasts of South Korea
Gymnasts at the 1992 Summer Olympics
Olympic bronze medalists for South Korea
Olympic medalists in gymnastics
Asian Games medalists in gymnastics
Gymnasts at the 1990 Asian Games
Gymnasts at the 1994 Asian Games
Kyung Hee University alumni
Asian Games silver medalists for South Korea
Asian Games bronze medalists for South Korea
Medalists at the 1990 Asian Games
Medalists at the 1994 Asian Games
Medalists at the 1992 Summer Olympics
Medalists at the World Artistic Gymnastics Championships
20th-century South Korean people